The peculiar institution may refer to:

 slavery, as it existed in the Southern United States before the passage of the Thirteenth Amendment
 The Peculiar Institution, a book by Kenneth Stampp about slavery in the United States